The 2020 Neste World RX of Riga-Latvia was the fifth and sixth round of the seventh season of the FIA World Rallycross Championship. The event was held at Biķernieku Kompleksā Sporta Bāze, in the Latvian capital of Riga.

Due to the COVID-19 pandemic, the event, originally planned as a "normal event", later became a double header (two races in a weekend)

Supercar Race 1 

Source

Heats 

Note :  René Münnich withdrawn from semi Final to allow his more experienced teammate Timo Scheider to participate

Semi-finals 

 Semi-Final 1

 Semi-Final 2

Final

Supercar Race 2 

Source

Heats

Semi-finals 

 Semi-Final 1

 Semi-Final 2 
(Red Flagged - Only 5 laps)‡

‡  The semi-final 2 was red-flagged due to the crash of Andreas Bakkerud. Timo Scheider, who finish the semi-final in third, was declared responsible for the incident and was disqualified. Neither Andreas Bakkerud nor his car was able to resume the competition. As a result, his place in the final was filled by Kevin Hansen.

Final

Standings after the event 

Source

 Note: Only the top six positions are included.

References

External links 

|- style="text-align:center"
|width="35%"|Previous race:2020 World RX of Finland
|width="40%"|FIA World Rallycross Championship2020 season
|width="35%"|Next race:2020 World RX of Catalunya
|- style="text-align:center"
|width="35%"|Previous race:2019 World RX of Latvia
|width="40%"|World RX of Latvia
|width="35%"|Next race:2021 World RX of Latvia
|- style="text-align:center"

2020 in Latvian sport
September 2020 sports events in Europe